Churchill Films aka Churchill Media was a producer and distributor of direct-to-video/educational films founded by Robert Churchill (1902-) and Sy Wexler (1916–2005) in 1948 as Churchill Wexler Film Productions. They have produced The Mouse and the Motorcycle (1986) based on the 1965 book by Beverly Cleary and many other award-winning children's films.

Churchill Films was acquired by American Educational Products in 1994. The Churchill Films catalog is now part of Discovery Education.

In December 2009, The Jungle (1967), a film distributed by Churchill Films in 16mm for the educational film market, was named to the National Film Registry.

Filmography 
(Incomplete)

References

External links
 

Film production companies of the United States